The National Highway 110 or the N-110 is one of Pakistan National Highway running from Gharo to the town of Keti Bunder in Thatta District in Sindh province of Pakistan. Its total length is 90 km, the highway is maintained and operated by Pakistan's National Highway Authority.

See also

References

External links
 National Highway Authority

Roads in Pakistan